A Aa E Ee is a 2009 Indian Tamil-language film directed by Sabapathy Dekshinamurthy. It stars Prabhu, Navdeep, Aravind Akash, Monica, and Saranya Mohan, whilst, supporting actors Cochin Haneefa, Livingston, Manorama and Ganja Karuppu play other prominent roles. Produced by the oldest Tamil film production company, AVM Productions, the film released on 9 January 2009. The film is a remake of Telugu hit Chandamama with Navdeep enacting the same role. The film received mixed reviews from critics.

Plot
Subramaniam (Prabhu), an ayurvedic physician, is a much-respected man in his village. His only daughter Anitha (Monica) returns home from Chennai after completing a course in fashion designing. Having lost her mother at a very young age, Anitha is close to her father, and they share a special bond. Soon, Anitha's marriage is fixed with Elango (Aravind Akash), the son of Vedachalam (Cochin Haneefa). While Vedachalam is a good-for-nothing chap, Elango is a perfect match. Elango falls in love with Anitha, but she tells him of her past: her lover Akash (Navdeep), who had jilted her after a one-night stand. Elango, though shattered, meets Akash and tries to unite him with Anitha. In this attempt, he finds himself falling in love with Anitha's cousin Eeswari (Saranya Mohan). Now the story is about uniting the two pairs of lovers. Anitha does not want to hurt her father with the knowledge of her past.

Cast

Prabhu as Subramaniam
Navdeep as Aakash
Monica as Anitha
Aravind Akash as Elango
Saranya Mohan as Eeswari
V. M. C. Haneefa as Vedachalam
Livingston as Police officer
Manorama as Elango's grandmother
Ganja Karuppu as Kicha
Sathyan as Elango's friend
Bonda Mani
Pandu as Doctor
R. S. Shivaji as Police officer
Vasu Vikram
Mohan Raman as Drummer
S. N. Lakshmi

Soundtrack
Soundtrack was composed by Vijay Antony and lyrics by Eknath, Priyan and Annamalai.

References

External links 
 
 A Aa E Ee at Paadal.com

2009 films
2000s Tamil-language films
Tamil remakes of Telugu films
Films scored by Vijay Antony
Films directed by Sabapathy Dekshinamurthy